Febi Widhiyanto (born 9 February 1980) is an Indonesian former professional tennis player.

A right-handed player from Jakarta, Widhiyanto competed in junior events at the French Open and Wimbledon. He had a win over Roger Federer at the 1996 World Youth Cup (Junior Davis Cup).

In his professional career he reached a top singles ranking of 495 in the world and won three doubles titles on the ITF Futures Circuit.

Widhiyanto played in 13 Davis Cup ties for Indonesia, winning 15 singles rubbers. He also represented Indonesia at the Southeast Asian Games, including in 2003 when he won a silver medal in the singles. As of 2019 he is Indonesia's non playing Davis Cup captain.

See also
List of Indonesia Davis Cup team representatives

References

External links
 
 
 

1980 births
Living people
Indonesian male tennis players
Sportspeople from Jakarta
Southeast Asian Games silver medalists for Indonesia
Southeast Asian Games bronze medalists for Indonesia
Southeast Asian Games medalists in tennis
Competitors at the 1999 Southeast Asian Games
Competitors at the 2003 Southeast Asian Games